The Sabah People's Party or  (PRS) is a minor party which was formed in 1989 by Sabah People's United Front (BERJAYA) leader James Peter Ongkili in an effort to woo Sabah voters from both BERJAYA and United Sabah Party (PBS) in the general elections.

Party logo

See also
Politics of Malaysia
List of political parties in Malaysia

References

Defunct political parties in Sabah
1989 establishments in Malaysia
Political parties established in 1989
1991 disestablishments in Malaysia
Political parties disestablished in 1991